Iress is a technology company providing software to the financial services industry in Asia-Pacific, North America, Africa and UK & Europe. Iress software has more than 200 integrations and 300 data feeds, and is used by more than 500,000 users globally.

It is listed on the Australian Securities Exchange (ASX), and is a member of the S&P/ASX 200 index.

History
Iress stands for Integrated Real-time Equity System. The company was formed in June 1993 as Dunai Financial Systems (DFS) by Peter Dunai, Neil Detering and Hung Do.  Two years later the equity information software product ‘Iress’ was launched.  In January 1997 Bridge Information Systems acquired 80% of Dunai Financial Systems (DFS) and formed BridgeDFS.

In June 1997 the trading software product ‘Iress Order System (IOS)’ was launched, in line with the ASX options market moving from floor to screen to commence electronic trading. In November 2000, BridgeDFS listed on the Australian Stock Exchange as BIS.ASX. and in October 2001, BridgeDFS changed its name to Iress Market Technology Limited (Iress).

Over the next decade, Iress expanded from a predominantly Australian operation, into a global technology business through a string of acquisitions. The company continued to evolve and expand to serve multiple client segments internationally.  It faced a range of competitors, and its software services incorporated global technology trends and financial services regulatory influences.

Key acquisitions 
2000: Listed on ASX
2003: Acquired Xplan (AU)
2004: Established Canadian JV (CA)
2006: Bought out Canadian JV (CA), Acquired Plantech (AU)
2007: Acquired Visiplan (AU), Acquired Spotlight (ZA)
2008: Acquired TransActive Systems (AU), Acquired DMS (AU)
2009: Acquired Fund Data (AU)
2010: Commenced operations in Asia, Acquired Sentryi (Asia)
2011: Commenced operations in the UK, Acquired Peresys (ZA)
2013: Acquired Avelo (UK)
2015: Acquired Innergi (AU), Acquired Proquote (UK), Acquired Pulse [10]
2016: Acquired Financial Synergy (AU) [12], Inet BFA (ZA)
2018: Acquired Pathway (AU)
2019: Acquired QuantHouse (FR)
2020: Acquired O&M Systems (UK), Acquired OneVue Holdings Limited (AU)

Software

Financial Advice 
 Xplan -Advice software platform 
 CommPay - Revenue & remuneration management software
 O&M Profiler - Pensions and investments research and planning software.

Trading and Market Data 
 Iress Order System - Trade order management software
 Pro - Market data & trading software
 Market Data - News, data & information service
 ViewPoint - Online trading & market data software
 QuantFeed - Low latency market data API for high-performance trading

Investment Management 
 Execution Management System - Multi-asset, multi-market, global trading software
 Portfolio System - Portfolio management software
 Pulse Symphony (UK) - Front, middle and back office investment management software
 O&M Profiler - Pensions and investments research and planning software.

Mortgages 
 Xplan Mortgage (UK) - Mortgage & protection sourcing & advice software
 Mortgage Sales & Origination (UK) - Mortgage processing software 
 Trigold (UK) - Mortgage sourcing software
 Lender Connect (UK) - Mortgage data flow software

Life and pensions 
 The Exchange (UK) - Quote comparison & application software
 O&M Profiler - Pensions and investments research and planning software.

Superannuation 
Automated Super Admin (AU) - digital offering that supports the day-to-day, back-office maintenance of superannuation funds 
 Acurity Registry (AU) - Registry software for super funds
 Acurity Online (AU) - Online portal for members & employers

Global Locations

Australia 

 Melbourne: Level 16, 385 Bourke Street, Melbourne, Victoria 3000
 Sydney: Level 1, 10 Shelley Street, Sydney, New South Wales 2000
 Brisbane: Level 2, 307 Queen Street, Brisbane, Queensland 4000
 Perth: Level 21, 44 St Georges Terrace, Perth, Western Australia 6000
 Adelaide: Suite 16, Level 5, 121 King William Street, Adelaide, South Australia 5000

United Kingdom 

 London: Level 7, 45 King William Street EC4R 9AN
 Cheltenham: Honeybourne Place, Jessop Avenue, GL50 3SH
 Colchester: 2 Charter Court, Newcomen Way, Severalls Business Park, 
 Leatherhead: Bluebird House, Unit 22 Mole Business Park, KT22 7AG

France 
 Paris: 86 Boulevard Haussmann, 75008 Paris

South Africa 
 Johannesburg: Building Three, 2929 on Nicol, 2929 William Nicol Drive, Bryanston, Sandton
 Cape Town: 5th Floor, Montclare Road, 35 Main Road, Claremont, Cape Town

Canada 
 Toronto: Bay Adelaide Centre, 333 Bay Street, Suite 720, PO Box 45, Toronto M5H 2R2

New Zealand 
 Auckland: Level 11, 57 Fort Street, Auckland

Singapore 
 Singapore: 18 Robinson Road, #19-01, Singapore 048547

Corporate affairs

Corporate social responsibility

Iress Foundation 
Established in 2017, the Iress Foundation initiatives are driven and run by Iress people from around the world. The initiatives involve creating events and fundraising programs to support people in the local communities in Australia, South Africa, Canada and the UK 

Some of the Foundation's support partners include:

Iress Foundation Australia: Whitelion - providing support for at-risk young people (www.whitelion.asn.au),  Two Good - supporting domestic violence survivors and soup kitchens through the power of good food (https://www.twogood.com.au/) and RURAL AID - Providing hands-on and holistic support to rural Australia. (www.ruralaid.org.au).

Iress Foundation United Kingdom: Cobalt Health supports patients with cancer, dementia and other conditions and is focused on helping everyone get access to the best medical imaging for their diagnosis (www.cobalthealth.co.uk). The Grange Centre provides vital services supporting people with learning disabilities to lead independent and fulfilling lives (www.grangecentre.org.uk). Crisis is the UK national charity for homeless people, working directly with thousands of homeless people every year to provide vital help so that people can rebuild their lives and are supported out of homelessness for good (www.crisis.org.uk). The Helping Hands Community Project gives people the support and opportunities they require to feel better about themselves, be more active in the community and get back into work (www.helpinghandscharity.org.uk).

Iress Foundation South Africa: Building an eco-system of coding skills and digital entrepreneurs in secondary schools to help build a new South African economy. (www.codeforchange.co.za). Adopting  the Healing Word Creche (Johannesburg) through Seeds of Africa, a community upliftment intervention (www.seedsofafrica.co.za). Contribute to training and resources for early childhood development (Durban) (www.tree-ecd.co.za).

Iress Foundation Canada: Supporting children and youth living with disability, medical complexity, illness and injury. (www.hollandbloorview.ca).

Environmental practices and initiatives 
Since 2015, Iress has reported its energy use, air travel for all offices (and associated emissions for a number of offices), in addition to paper use as part of its risk reporting as recommended by the ASX Corporate Governance Principles and Recommendations (3rd ed.). Since January 2021, Iress’ offices in Sydney and Melbourne use 100% renewable energy. These offices contribute 95% of energy use across Australian operations.

Management team

Board of Directors  
Roger Sharp - Non-Executive Director and Chair

Anthony Glenning - Non-Executive Director

Niki Beattie - Non-Executive Director

Michael Dwyer - Non-Executive Director

Julie Fahey - Non-Executive Director 

Trudy Vonhoff - Non-Executive Director

Marcus Price - Managing Director and Chief Executive Officer

Executive Team 
Marcus Price - Chief Executive Officer

Andrew Todd - Chief Technology Officer

Kelly Fisk - Chief Communications & Marketing Officer

Joydip Das - Chief Product Officer

John Harris - Chief Financial Officer

Julia McNeill - Chief People Officer

Simon New - Chief Commercial Officer

Peter Ferguson - Chief Legal Officer & Company Secretary

References

External links 
 Official site
 Official blog

Companies listed on the Australian Securities Exchange
Software companies of Australia
Electronic trading systems
Australian companies established in 1993